The Portuguese local election of 2005 took place on 9 October 2005. The election consisted of three separate elections in the 308 Portuguese municipalities, the election for the Municipal Chambers, whose winner is elected mayor, another election for the Municipal Assembly and a last one for the lower-level Parish Assembly, whose winner is elected parish president. This last was held separately in the more than 4,000 parishes around the country.

The Socialist Party may be considered the major defeated party of this election due to a slight loss of mandates. The Socialists did, however, achieve a better percentage of the vote in relation to the election of 2001.

On the right, the Social Democratic Party stole some municipalities from the Socialists, some of them in coalition with the People's Party that was reduced to only one municipality in stand-alone candidacies, Ponte de Lima, continuing its decline in comparison, for example, with the 36 mayors achieved in 1976.

On the left, the Unitary Democratic Coalition, led by the Communist Party, regained some of its former influence, taking 4 municipalities and several parishes from the Socialists in the districts of Beja, Évora and Setúbal and Leiria achieving a total of 32 mayors, and winning, for the first time, the election in Peniche. The Left Bloc kept the presidency of its single municipality, Salvaterra de Magos.

The election was also remarkable for the several victories of independent candidates, most of them former Socialist, Social Democratic and People's Party candidates who were expelled or given no confidence, because of corruption accusations, by their respective parties and, even so, became mayors. The best known were Valentim Loureiro in Gondomar, Fátima Felgueiras in Felgueiras and Isaltino Morais in Oeiras.

Parties 

The main political forces involved in the election were:

 Left Bloc (BE)
 People's Party (CDS–PP)
 Democratic Unity Coalition (CDU)
 Socialist Party (PS)
 Social Democratic Party (PSD)

Results

Municipal Councils

National summary of votes and seats

|-
! rowspan="2" colspan=2 style="background-color:#E9E9E9" align=left|Parties
! rowspan="2" style="background-color:#E9E9E9" align=right|Votes
! rowspan="2" style="background-color:#E9E9E9" align=right|%
! rowspan="2" style="background-color:#E9E9E9" align=right|±pp swing
! rowspan="2" style="background-color:#E9E9E9" align=right|Candidacies
! colspan="2" style="background-color:#E9E9E9" align="center"|Councillors
! colspan="2" style="background-color:#E9E9E9" align="center"|Mayors
|- style="background-color:#E9E9E9"
! style="background-color:#E9E9E9" align="center"|Total
! style="background-color:#E9E9E9" align="center"|±
! style="background-color:#E9E9E9" align="center"|Total
! style="background-color:#E9E9E9" align="center"|±
|-
| 
|1,933,041||35.87||1.8||307||853||24||109||4
|-
| 
|1,523,526||28.27||0.1||245||742||32||138||4
|-
| 
|589,384||10.94||0.3||301||203||4||32||4
|-
|style="width: 10px" bgcolor=#FF9900 align="center" | 
|align=left|Social Democratic / People's
|462,199||8.58||0.4||42||131||17||18||3
|-
| 
|165,192||3.07||0.6||185||30||9||1||2
|-
| 
|158,953||2.95||1.8||111||7||1||1||0
|-
|style="width: 8px" bgcolor=gray align="center" |
|align=left|Independents
|133,380||2.47||0.9||27||45||14||7||4
|-
|style="width: 9px" bgcolor=#FF9900 align="center" | 
|align=left|PSD / CDS–PP / PPM
|91,455||1.70||0.4||12||20||10||1||0
|- 
|style="width: 9px" bgcolor=#FF9900 align="center" | 
|align=left|PSD / CDS–PP / PPM / MPT
|71,153||1.32||—||3||11||—||1||—
|-
| 
|15,421||0.29||0.0||19||0||0||0||0
|-
| 
|5,096||0.09||0.0||13||0||0||0||0
|-
| 
|2,045||0.04||—||4||0||—||0||—
|-
| 
|1,759||0.03||0.0||5||0||0||0||0
|-
|style="width: 9px" bgcolor=#FF9900 align="center" |
|align=left|PSD / CDS–PP / MPT
|1,670||0.03||—||1||2||—||0||—
|-
| 
|1,582||0.03||0.2||4||0||4||0||1
|-
|style="width: 9px" bgcolor=#FF9900 align="center" |
|align=left|PSD / PPM
|707||0.01||2.5||1||0||8||0||1
|-
|style="width: 8px" bgcolor=#1F468B align="center" |
|align=left|PND / PPM
|439||0.01||—||1||0||—||0||—
|-
|style="width: 10px" bgcolor=#000080 align="center" | 
|align=left|National Solidarity
|244||0.00||—||1||0||—||0||—
|-
|style="width: 8px" bgcolor=#0093DD align="center" |
|align=left|People's / Social Democratic
|109||0.00||0.2||1||0||6||0||0
|-
|style="width: 8px" bgcolor=#0093DD align="center" |
|align=left|CDS–PP / PSD / PPM
|11||0.00||—||1||0||—||0||—
|-
|colspan=2 align=left style="background-color:#E9E9E9"|Total valid
|width="65" align="right" style="background-color:#E9E9E9"|5,159,104
|width="40" align="right" style="background-color:#E9E9E9"|95.73
|width="40" align="right" style="background-color:#E9E9E9"|0.6
|width="40" align="right" style="background-color:#E9E9E9"|—
|width="45" align="right" style="background-color:#E9E9E9"|2,046
|width="45" align="right" style="background-color:#E9E9E9"|2
|width="45" align="right" style="background-color:#E9E9E9"|308
|width="45" align="right" style="background-color:#E9E9E9"|0
|-
|colspan=2|Blank ballots
|139,012||2.58||0.4||colspan=6 rowspan=4|
|-
|colspan=2|Invalid ballots
|90,919||1.69||0.2
|-
|colspan=2 align=left style="background-color:#E9E9E9"|Total
|width="65" align="right" style="background-color:#E9E9E9"|5,389,035
|width="40" align="right" style="background-color:#E9E9E9"|100.00
|width="40" align="right" style="background-color:#E9E9E9"|
|-
|colspan=2|Registered voters/turnout
||8,843,875||60.94||0.8
|}

Municipality map

City control
The following table lists party control in all district capitals, as well as in municipalities above 100,000 inhabitants. Population estimates from the 2001 Census.

Municipal Assemblies

National summary of votes and seats

|-
! rowspan="2" colspan=2 style="background-color:#E9E9E9" align=left|Parties
! rowspan="2" style="background-color:#E9E9E9" align=right|Votes
! rowspan="2" style="background-color:#E9E9E9" align=right|%
! rowspan="2" style="background-color:#E9E9E9" align=right|±pp swing
! rowspan="2" style="background-color:#E9E9E9" align=right|Candidacies
! colspan="2" style="background-color:#E9E9E9" align="center"|Mandates
|- style="background-color:#E9E9E9"
! style="background-color:#E9E9E9" align="center"|Total
! style="background-color:#E9E9E9" align="center"|±
|- 
| 
|align=right| 1,923,468
|align=right|35.68
|align=right|1.7
|align=right|307
|align=right|2,794
|align=right|73
|-
| 
|align=right|1,454,256
|align=right|26.98
|align=right|0.2
|align=right| 245
|align=right|2,416 
|align=right|52
|-  
| 
|align=right|628,881  	
|align=right|11.67
|align=right|0.6
|align=right|301
|align=right|722
|align=right|13
|-
|style="width: 10px" bgcolor=#FF9900 align="center" | 
|align=left|Social Democratic / People's
|align=right|454,972
|align=right|8.44
|align=right|0.9
|align=right|41
|align=right|407 
|align=right|20
|-
| 
|align=right|212,652
|align=right|3.95
|align=right|2.4
|align=right|115
|align=right|114 
|align=right|86
|-
| 
|align=right|175,927
|align=right|3.26
|align=right|1.0
|align=right|162
|align=right|190 
|align=right|63
|-
|style="width: 8px" bgcolor=gray align="center" |
|align=left|Independents
|align=right| 115,999  	
|align=right| 2.15
|align=right|1.0
|align=right| 25 
|align=right| 121
|align=right|28
|-
|style="width: 9px" bgcolor=#FF9900 align="center" | 
|align=left|PSD / CDS–PP / PPM
|align=right| 90,670
|align=right| 1.68
|align=right|0.5
|align=right|13
|align=right| 73
|align=right|33
|-
|style="width: 9px" bgcolor=#FF9900 align="center" | 
|align=left|PSD / CDS–PP / PPM / MPT
|align=right|66,190   	
|align=right|1.23
|align=right|—
|align=right|3
|align=right|27 
|align=right|—
|-
| 
|align=right| 8,620  	  	
|align=right|0.16
|align=right|0.0
|align=right|9 
|align=right|1
|align=right|0
|-
|style="width: 8px" bgcolor=#0093DD align="center" |
|align=left|People's / Social Democratic
|align=right| 2,768
|align=right| 0.05
|align=right|0.0
|align=right| 2
|align=right| 6 
|align=right| 13
|-
|style="width: 9px" bgcolor=#FF9900 align="center" |
|align=left|PSD / CDS–PP / MPT
|align=right| 1,641 
|align=right| 0.03
|align=right| —
|align=right| 1
|align=right| 6 
|align=right| —
|-
| 
|align=right|1,590  	
|align=right|0.03
|align=right|0.2
|align=right|1
|align=right|0 
|align=right|18
|-
| 
|align=right|1,590
|align=right| 0.03
|align=right| —
|align=right| 2 
|align=right| 1 
|align=right| —
|-
| 
|align=right| 1,011
|align=right| 0.02
|align=right| 0.0
|align=right| 6
|align=right| 5 
|align=right| 5
|-
|style="width: 8px" bgcolor=#1F468B align="center" |
|align=left|PND / PPM
|align=right| 831
|align=right| 0.02
|align=right| —
|align=right| 1
|align=right| 0 
|align=right| —
|-
|style="width: 9px" bgcolor=#FF9900 align="center" |
|align=left|PSD / PPM
|align=right| 760
|align=right| 0.01
|align=right| 2.4
|align=right| 1
|align=right| 2
|align=right| 21
|-
| 
|align=right| 200
|align=right| 0.00
|align=right| 0.0
|align=right| 2
|align=right| 0 
|align=right| 0
|-
|style="width: 8px" bgcolor=#0093DD align="center" |
|align=left|CDS–PP / PSD / PPM
|align=right| 8
|align=right| 0.00
|align=right| —
|align=right| 1
|align=right| 0 
|align=right| —
|-
|colspan=2 align=left style="background-color:#E9E9E9"|Total valid
|width="65" align="right" style="background-color:#E9E9E9"|5,161,181
|width="40" align="right" style="background-color:#E9E9E9"|95.72
|width="40" align="right" style="background-color:#E9E9E9"|0.3
|width="40" align="right" style="background-color:#E9E9E9"|—
|width="45" align="right" style="background-color:#E9E9E9"|6,885
|width="45" align="right" style="background-color:#E9E9E9"|9
|-
|colspan=2|Blank ballots
|138,424||2.57||0.1||colspan=6 rowspan=4|
|-
|colspan=2|Invalid ballots
|92,140||1.71||0.2
|-
|colspan=2 align=left style="background-color:#E9E9E9"|Total
|width="65" align="right" style="background-color:#E9E9E9"|5,391,745
|width="40" align="right" style="background-color:#E9E9E9"|100.00
|width="40" align="right" style="background-color:#E9E9E9"|
|-
|colspan=2|Registered voters/turnout
||8,847,385||60.94||0.8
|}

Parish Assemblies

National summary of votes and seats

|-
! rowspan="2" colspan=2 style="background-color:#E9E9E9" align=left|Parties
! rowspan="2" style="background-color:#E9E9E9" align=right|Votes
! rowspan="2" style="background-color:#E9E9E9" align=right|%
! rowspan="2" style="background-color:#E9E9E9" align=right|±pp swing
! rowspan="2" style="background-color:#E9E9E9" align=right|Candidacies
! colspan="2" style="background-color:#E9E9E9" align="center"|Mandates
! colspan="2" style="background-color:#E9E9E9" align="center"|Presidents
|- style="background-color:#E9E9E9"
! style="background-color:#E9E9E9" align="center"|Total
! style="background-color:#E9E9E9" align="center"|±
! style="background-color:#E9E9E9" align="center"|Total
! style="background-color:#E9E9E9" align="center"|±
|-
| 
|align=right| 1,903,166
|align=right| 35.37
|align=right| 1.5
|align=right| 3,711
|align=right| 13,460
|align=right| 265
|align=right|1,518
|align=right| 5
|-
| 
|align=right| 1,433,256
|align=right| 26.64
|align=right| 0.1
|align=right| 3,065
|align=right| 12,447 
|align=right|299
|align=right| 1,723
|align=right| 74
|-  
| 
|align=right| 648,622  	 	
|align=right| 12.05
|align=right| 0.9
|align=right| 2,239
|align=right| 2,576
|align=right| 110
|align=right| 244
|align=right| 12
|-
|style="width: 10px" bgcolor=#FF9900 align="center" | 
|align=left|Social Democratic / People's
|align=right| 411,633
|align=right| 7.65
|align=right| 0.6
|align=right| 529
|align=right| 2,065 
|align=right| 59
|align=right| 219
|align=right| 4
|-
|style="width: 8px" bgcolor=gray align="center" |
|align=left|Independents
|align=right| 245,659  	
|align=right| 4.57
|align=right| 0.2
|align=right| 568 
|align=right| 2,201
|align=right| 206
|align=right| 292
|align=right| 19
|-
| 
|align=right| 146,898
|align=right| 2.73
|align=right| 1.6
|align=right| 448
|align=right| 229 
|align=right| 183
|align=right| 3
|align=right| 3
|-
| 
|align=right| 144,575
|align=right| 2.69
|align=right| 0.9
|align=right| 1,043
|align=right| 826 
|align=right| 144
|align=right| 65
|align=right| 14
|-
|style="width: 9px" bgcolor=#FF9900 align="center" | 
|align=left|PSD / CDS–PP / PPM / MPT
|align=right|95,175  	
|align=right| 1.77
|align=right| —
|align=right| 45
|align=right| 216 
|align=right| —
|align=right| 19
|align=right| —
|-
|style="width: 9px" bgcolor=#FF9900 align="center" | 
|align=left|PSD / CDS–PP / PPM
|align=right| 84,398
|align=right| 1.57
|align=right| 0.7
|align=right| 125
|align=right| 400
|align=right| 98
|align=right| 34
|align=right| 2
|-
| 
|align=right| 3,635  	
|align=right| 0.07
|align=right| 0.0
|align=right| 28 
|align=right| 0
|align=right| 1
|align=right| 0
|align=right|0
|-
| 
|align=right|3,184  	
|align=right|0.06
|align=right|—
|align=right|16 
|align=right|7 
|align=right|—
|align=right|0
|align=right|—
|-
| 
|align=right|3,100
|align=right|0.06
|align=right|0.1
|align=right|7
|align=right|23 
|align=right|97
|align=right|3
|align=right|15
|-
|style="width: 9px" bgcolor=#FF9900 align="center" |
|align=left|PSD / CDS–PP / MPT
|align=right| 1,756 
|align=right| 0.03
|align=right| —
|align=right| 12
|align=right| 32 
|align=right| —
|align=right| 3
|align=right| —
|-
|style="width: 8px" bgcolor=#0093DD align="center" |
|align=left|People's / Social Democratic
|align=right|1,448
|align=right|0.03
|align=right|0.1
|align=right|2
|align=right|10 
|align=right|57
|align=right|2
|align=right|6
|-
| 
|align=right| 824
|align=right| 0.02
|align=right|0.0
|align=right| 10
|align=right|0 
|align=right| 0
|align=right| 0
|align=right| 0
|-
|style="width: 9px" bgcolor=#FF9900 align="center" |
|align=left|PSD / PPM
|align=right| 807
|align=right| 0.02
|align=right|2.3
|align=right| 5
|align=right| 6 
|align=right| 259
|align=right| 0
|align=right| 18
|-
|style="width: 10px" bgcolor=#000080 align="center" | 
|align=left|National Solidarity
|align=right| 72
|align=right| 0.00
|align=right| —
|align=right| 5
|align=right| 0 
|align=right| —
|align=right| 0
|align=right| —
|-
| 
|align=right| 38
|align=right| 0.00
|align=right| —
|align=right| 1
|align=right| 0 
|align=right| —
|align=right| 0
|align=right| —
|-
| 
|align=right| 27
|align=right| 0.00
|align=right| 0.0
|align=right| 1
|align=right| 0 
|align=right| 1
|align=right| 0
|align=right| 0
|-
|colspan=2 align=left style="background-color:#E9E9E9"|Total valid
|width="65" align="right" style="background-color:#E9E9E9"|5,130,086
|width="40" align="right" style="background-color:#E9E9E9"|95.31
|width="40" align="right" style="background-color:#E9E9E9"|0.7
|width="40" align="right" style="background-color:#E9E9E9"|—
|width="45" align="right" style="background-color:#E9E9E9"|34,498
|width="45" align="right" style="background-color:#E9E9E9"|—
|width="45" align="right" style="background-color:#E9E9E9"|4,125
|width="45" align="right" style="background-color:#E9E9E9"|—
|-
|colspan=2|Blank ballots
|151,527||2.82||0.5||colspan=6 rowspan=4|
|-
|colspan=2|Invalid ballots
|101,067||1.88||0.2
|-
|colspan=2 align=left style="background-color:#E9E9E9"|Total
|width="65" align="right" style="background-color:#E9E9E9"|5,382,680
|width="40" align="right" style="background-color:#E9E9E9"|100.00
|width="40" align="right" style="background-color:#E9E9E9"|
|-
|colspan=2|Registered voters/turnout
||8,832,693||60.94||0.9
|}

End notes 

 The source of the voting data is the Portuguese Electoral Commission 

Further Notes:
 Democratic Unity Coalition (CDU) is composed of the Portuguese Communist Party (PCP),  "The Greens" (PEV) and the Democratic Intervention (ID).
 The different coalitions between the Social Democratic Party (PSD), the People's Party (CDS–PP), the People's Monarchist Party (PPM) or the  Earth Party (MPT) appear because each municipality has its own election.
 The number of candidacies expresses the number of municipalities or parishes in which the party or coalition presented lists.
 The number of mandates expresses the number of municipal deputies in the Municipal Assembly election and the number of parish deputies in the Parish Assembly election.
 The turnout varies because one may choose not to vote for all the organs.

References

Portuguese local elections
2005
October 2005 events in Europe